Team Bangladesh Jute Mills Corporation (Team BJMC) was a sporting club in Bangladesh, which is mainly located in the city of Dhaka. The club was formerly known as East Pakistan IDC prior to 1971 and Bangladesh JIC from 1971 until 1978, from which point onward the club has been renamed to Team BJMC. In 1981 the club had stopped all their football related activities, however, after 29 years, in 2010 they restarted playing professional football under the new manager Arif Khan Joy. In 2019, Team BJMC was relegated from Bangladesh Premier League, the top-tier association football league in Bangladesh & postponed its football activities in 2019.

Squad
 Bangladeshi players:
Arifuzzaman Hemel (GK), Ariful Islam (GK), Mohammed Karim (GK), Md. Nayeem (GK), Amit Khan Shuvra, S.M. Rajib, Khan Md. Tara, Shahanur Rahman Rony, Redwad Bin Rakin, Md. Shakil Ahmed, Md. Soyeb Mia, Musaddek Khan Murad, Md. Mahmudul Hasan, Sabbir Ahmed Sumon, Omar Faruk Babu, Abdullah Al Parvez, Loutfor Rahman Noyon, Md. faysal Ahmed, Md. Masud Rana, Jakir Hossain Ziku, Md. Moklesur Rahman, Ali Akbar Kanon, Saiful Islam Saif, Aung Thowai Ching Marma, Md. Shapon, Abdullah Al Mamun, Aminur Rahman Shajib, Mahadi Hasan Tapu, Md. Arif Hossain
 Foreign players:
  Jean Jules Ikanga
  Samson Iliasu
  Uche Felix
  Ismael Bangoura

Home venue 
From 2018-2019 season, Team BJMC is sharing their home venue with NoFeL Sporting Club at Shaheed Bulu Stadium of Noakhali District.

Coaching staff
 Manager=  Arif Khan Joy
 Head coach= vacant
 Asst coach=  Ali Asgar Nasir

Honours
 Dhaka League
Champions (5): 1967, 1968, 1970, 1973, 1979

Dhaka Second Division Football League
Champions (2): 1965, ?

References

External links
 http://www.weltfussballarchiv.com/club_profile.php?IDD=12657
 BJMC official site
 Team BJMC on Mycujoo

Sport in Dhaka
Football clubs in Bangladesh
2010 establishments in Bangladesh
Association football clubs established in 2010